Pararheinheimera soli is a Gram-negative and non-spore-forming bacterium from the genus of Pararheinheimera which has been isolated from playground soil from Jinju in Korea.

References 

Chromatiales
Bacteria described in 2008